This article lists all power stations in Somalia.

Thermal

See also
 Energy in Somalia
 List of largest power stations in the world
 List of power stations in Africa

References

External links
 Cultural impact of power stations in Somalia
 About Somaliland's Wind Power Sector

Somalia
Power stations